A total lunar eclipse took place on Friday, April 22, 1921. This was the first total lunar eclipse of Saros cycle 130. A shallow total eclipse saw the Moon in relative darkness for 40 minutes and 6 seconds. The Moon was approximately 7% of its diameter into the Earth's umbral shadow, and should have been significantly darkened. The partial eclipse lasted for 3 hours and 22 minutes in total.

Visibility

Related lunar eclipses

Saros series

Half-Saros cycle
A lunar eclipse will be preceded and followed by solar eclipses by 9 years and 5.5 days (a half saros). This lunar eclipse is related to two annular solar eclipses of Solar Saros 137.

17 April 1912 
!April 17, 1912
|

28 April 1930 
!April 28, 1930
I

See also
List of lunar eclipses
List of 20th-century lunar eclipses

Notes

External links

1921-04
1921 in science